School Diary is a 2018 Malayalam-language film written and directed by M Hajamoinu and produced by Anvar Sadath. The film stars Bhama Arun, Vismaya Viswanath, Mamitha Baiju, Reena Bashir, Ashkar Soudan, Hashim Hussain, Indrans and Balaji Sarma in the lead roles. The music was composed by M G Sreekumar.

Plot 
The story revolves around five grade XII students in a school in Kerala named Archa, Indu, Rima, Diya and Yamuna. Aarcha got covered in the news as her poem "Aksharamaalayil Amma" was going to be included in the Kerala state syllabus. They also try to make a difference by growing farm vegetables for the poor. They also come up with an idea of a "School diary" for students of their school. There happens different situations where in the friendship of five girls along with four boys are tested such that they will have to uphold their true friendship.

Cast 
 Bhama Arun as Archa   
 Mamitha Baiju as Indu
 Anakha S. Nair as Rima
 Diyaa as Diya
 Vismaya Viswanath as Yamuna
 Hashim Hussain as Vishnu
 Reena Bashir as Archa's mother  
 Indrans
 Balaji Sarma
 Ashkar Soudan as Heman
 Anvar Sadath as Teacher
 Snisha Chandran as Teacher
 M G Sreekumar as himself (cameo)

Soundtrack 
The music is composed by M. G. Sreekumar.

Reception
Anna M. M. Vetticad of Firstpost gave a rating of 0/5 to the movie.

References

External links 
 

2018 films
2010s Malayalam-language films